Umbrella effect may refer to:
 Umbrella effect (ecology). in which the presence of an umbrella species protects other species in the same habitat
 Umbrella effect (economics). in which a dominant company or cartel creates an "umbrella" of high prices over the rest of the market
 Umbrella effect (everyday life). in which the act of bringing an umbrella and raincoat, or otherwise preparing thoroughly for inclement weather, appears to prevent the predicted rainfall from occurring
 Umbrella effect (upper management). in which upper management seems to cast a shadow over their employee's, using them to conduct "shady" business.